Modautal is a municipality in the Darmstadt-Dieburg district, in Hesse, Germany. Approximately 5,050 inhabitants live in 11 districts on an area of 31 km2 with about 38.7% wood. The first historical chronicles date back to the 13th century.

History
The municipality was formed in 1977 by putting together eleven districts during the so-called Gebietsreform. During the time of the Celts the area must have already been inhabited since the so-called "Heuneburg" on a hill in Fischbachtal was a Celtic castle where the people and their animals from the region could flee (Fluchtburg). To construct such a building, a lot of helping hands must have been living nearby.

In the Middle Ages, the eleven villages of Modautal belonged to different knight's families: The family of Rodenstein, the family from Frankenstein, the one from Mosbach, the family of Wallbrunn as well as Stumpf von Asbach and Kalb von Reinheim just to name a few. The oldest available documents date back to 1651 and are the so-called "Haingerichtsbücher" (written rules of the peasants in Brandau).

During the revolution in 1848 and due to failure of crops, huge parts of the inhabitants of the villages emigrated to North America.

Town districts

References

External links
 Website Modautal(in German)

Darmstadt-Dieburg
Municipalities in Hesse